Purity culture is a subculture within Christianity which emphasizes subjective individual "purity," generally associated with female chastity.

Components 
Purity culture places a strong emphasis on abstinence from sexual intercourse before marriage. Dating is discouraged entirely to avoid pre-marital sex.

Woman and girls are told to cover up and dress modestly to avoid supposedly arousing sexual urges in men and boys. Purity culture also emphasizes traditional gender roles.

Masturbation is discouraged more strongly for women than for men.

Purity balls 

A purity ball is a formal dance event. The events are attended by fathers and their teenage daughters in order to promote virginity until marriage. Typically, daughters who attend a purity ball make a virginity pledge to remain sexually abstinent until marriage. Fathers who attend a purity ball make a promise to protect their young daughters' "purity of mind, body, and soul." Proponents of these events believe that they encourage close and deeply affectionate relationships between fathers and daughters, thereby avoiding the premarital sexual activity that allegedly results when young women seek love through relationships with young men. Critics of the balls argue that they encourage and engrave dysfunctional expectations in the minds of the young women, making them vulnerable to believing their only value is as property, and teaching them that they must subjugate their own mental, physical, and emotional well-being to the needs of potentially or actually abusive partners.

Purity rings 

Since the 1990s Christian organizations, especially Catholic and evangelical Christian groups, promoting virginity pledges and virginity before marriage, like True Love Waits and Silver Ring Thing, used the purity ring as a symbol of commitment to purity culture.

History 
Purity culture had been a facet of Christian writing for a while but purity culture as a youth movement took hold in the 1990s. A whole industry selling books, rings, and other products emerged around the movement.

The first purity ball was held in 1998.

Purity culture faded out of popularity after the first decade of the 2000s.

Effects and legacy 
Purity culture was largely an American phenomenon although it was exported abroad by American religious and government groups. It has also influenced groups like Girl Defined.

The popularity of purity culture did not have a significant impact on teenage STD rates in the United States.

Purity culture has had a negative effect on the physical health of many of the women involved in it.

See also 
 Abstinence-only sex education
 Antisexualism
 Celibacy

References 

Sexual abstinence
Modesty in Christianity